Brody-Parcele  is a village in Nowy Dwór County, Masovian Voivodeship, in east-central Poland. It is the seat of the gmina (administrative district) called Gmina Pomiechówek.

The village has a population of 1,600.

References

Brody-Parcele